An opera film is a recording of an opera on film.

References

 
Film
Film genres